The Gold Medal (Welsh: Medal Aur) of the National Eisteddfod of Wales is awarded annually in three categories for excellence in Fine Art, Architecture, or Craft and Design.

Background
The National Eisteddfod of Wales is Wales' most important national cultural event, taking place annually. Its open exhibition of art and craft, Y Lle Celf (Welsh: 'The Art Space') is one of the highlights of the Welsh arts calendar. Gold medals are awarded in the Visual Arts section for outstanding contributions in different media: a Gold Medal for Fine Art has been awarded since 1951; a medal for Architecture has been offered since 1954 (though withheld and not awarded between 1954 and 1959); and a Gold Medal for Craft and Design has been awarded since 1985.

Other awards are the Tony Goble Award, given to a first time exhibitor, and the Josef Herman Award, chosen by the public (Josef Herman, a Polish emigree, won the Fine Art medal in 1962).

The Architecture award was endowed by Thomas Alwyn Lloyd and is given in conjunction with the Design Commission for Wales and the Royal Society of Architects in Wales, who advise the Eisteddfod judges.

The award is given to practitioners working in Wales, and a language rule has been in force since 1950 that any original words in art works must be in the Welsh language. In 2013 there was controversy when a video entirely in English by England-born University of Wales Newport student Josephine Sowden was awarded the Fine Art medal.

In January 2014 the Wales Millennium Centre (WMC) and Craft in the Bay, Cardiff held an exhibition showcasing the work of previous winners of the Fine Art and the Craft awards.

The 2014 Open Exhibition exhibited the work of 44 artists, selected from 300 entries.

Winners

Fine Art
Source: The National Eisteddfod of Wales

Architecture
 2019 – Featherstone Young, London, for Tŷ Pawb, Wrexham
 2018 – KKE Architects, Worcester, for their work on St Davids Hospice Care in Newport
 2017 – Stride Treglown, for Ysgol Bae Baglan, Port Talbot
 2016 – Hall & Bednarczyk, for the Visitor and Water Sports Centre, Llandegfedd
 2015 – Loyn & Co, for Millbrook House, in Lisvane, Cardiff. This was the first time since 1979 that a winner had won two years in succession.
 2014 – Loyn & Co, for 'Stormy Castle', a sustainable home on the Gower Peninsula
 2013 – John Pardey Architects, for 'Trewarren', a house in Pembrokeshire
 2012 – HLM Architects, for Archbishop McGrath Catholic High School, Bridgend
 2011 – Ellis Williams Architects, for Oriel Mostyn, Llandudno
 2010 – Medal not awarded
 2009 – Ray Hole Architects, for Hafod Eryri visitor centre, Snowdon
 2008 – Purcell Miller Tritton, for Blaenavon World Heritage Centre, Blaenavon
 2007 – Loyn & Co, for the Water Tower, Cyncoed, Cardiff, breaking the normal tradition of making the award for a public building.
 2006 – Richard Rogers, for the Senedd, Cardiff
 2005 – Capita Percy Thomas, Cardiff, for the Wales Millennium Centre, Cardiff
 2004 – Powell Dobson Architects, Cardiff, for the Brewery Quarter area, Cardiff
 2003 – Nicholas Hare Architects, London, for  No 1 Callaghan Square, Cardiff
 2002 – Pembroke Design Ltd, Pembroke Dock, for Ysgol Bro Dewi, St Davids
 2001 – David Lea and Pat Borer, Pen-y-bont Fawr, for WISE at the Centre for Alternative Technology, Machynlleth
 2000 – Foster + Partners, London, for the Great Glasshouse, National Botanic Garden of Wales, Llanarthne
 1999 – Smith Roberts Associates, Bristol, for the Pembrokeshire Coast National Park Visitor Centre, St Davids
 1998 – Arup, London, for the Control Techniques Research and Development HQ, Newtown
 1997 – PCKO Architects, Middlesex, for The Swansea Foyer, Swansea
 1996 – Holder Mathias Alcock, Cardiff, for the NCM Building (now Atradius), Cardiff Bay
 1995 – No medal awarded
 1994 – No medal awarded
 1993 – Niall Phillips Architects, Bristol, for Lower Treginnis Farm, St Davids
 1992 – No medal awarded
 1991 – Allen Jenkins and Phil Read, South Glamorgan County Council, for the County Hall, Butetown, Cardiff
 1990 – No medal awarded 1989 – No medal awarded 1988 – Welsh Health Common Services Authority, for the Ystradgynlais Community Hospital, Ystradgynlais, Powys
 1987 – Merfyn Roberts and Dewi-Prys Thomas, for Gwynedd Council, Caernarfon
 1986 – Welsh Health Common Services Authority Architects, for the Mold Community Hospital, Mold, Flintshire
 1985 – Bowen Dann Davies Partnership, Colwyn Bay, for National Outdoor Centre for Wales, Plas Menai
 1984 – Bowen Dann Davies Partnership, Colwyn Bay, for Capel y Groes, Wrexham
 1983 – Percy Thomas Partnership, Cardiff, for Amersham International Laboratories, Cardiff
 1982 – Bowen Dann Davies Partnership, Colwyn Bay, for Hafan Elen, Llanrug, Caernarfon
 1981 – No medal awarded 1980 – No medal awarded 1979 – Percy Thomas Partnership, Cardiff, for the Hugh Owen Building, Aberystwyth University, Aberystwyth
 1978 – Percy Thomas Partnership, Cardiff, for St Fagans National Museum of History, St Fagans, Cardiff
 1977 – Bowen Dann Partnership for the Hostel, Cefndy Road, Rhyl
 1976 – Percy Thomas Partnership, Cardiff, for the Parke-Davis Pharmaceutical Building, Pontypool
 1975 – John Sam Williams, Pwllheli, for the Special School in Y Ffôr, Pwllheli
 1974 – Percy Thomas Partnership, Cardiff, for Albert Edward Prince of Wales Court Care Home, Porthcawl
 1973 – No medal awarded 1972 – T G Jones and J R Evans, for Little Orchard, Dinas Powys
 1971 – Percy Thomas Partnership, Cardiff, for the Great Hall and Students Union, Aberystwyth University, Aberystwyth
 1970 – Sir Percy Thomas and Son, Cardiff, for the Physics and Mathematics Building, Swansea University, Swansea
 1969 – Ormrod Partnership, Liverpool, for the Pilkington Perkin-Elmer Building, St Asaph
 1968 – Hird & Brooks, Cardiff, for The Gore (house and swimming pool), Llantrisant Road, Llandaff, Cardiff
 1967 – No medal awarded 1966-61 – Medal not offered 1960 – G Grenfell Baines & Hargreaves, Preston, for the H. J. Heinz Offices, Cardiff
 1959-54 – No medal awarded''

Craft and design
Source: The National Eisteddfod of Wales

See also

 List of European art awards

References

Architecture awards
British art awards
Design awards
 
Architecture in Wales
Welsh art
Arts awards in the United Kingdom